The 1901 Case football team was an American football team that represented the Case School of Applied Science in Cleveland, Ohio, now a part of Case Western Reserve University. Playing as an independent during the 1902 college football season, the team compiled a 2–7 record and was outscored by a total of 181 to 38. John J. Dillon, formerly the quarterback for Syracuse, was hired as the team's football coach in April 1901.

Schedule

References

Case
Case Western Reserve Spartans football seasons
Case football